This is a list of singles that have peaked in the top 10 of the Billboard Hot 100 during 1961.

Elvis Presley scored six top ten hits during the year with "Surrender", "I Feel So Bad", "Little Sister", "(Marie's the Name) His Latest Flame", "Are You Lonesome Tonight?", and "Can't Help Falling in Love", the most among all other artists.

Top-ten singles

1960 peaks

1962 peaks

See also
 1961 in music
 List of Hot 100 number-one singles of 1961 (U.S.)
 Billboard Year-End Hot 100 singles of 1961

References

General sources

Joel Whitburn Presents the Billboard Hot 100 Charts: The Sixties
Additional information obtained can be verified within Billboard's online archive services and print editions of the magazine.

1961
United States Hot 100 Top 10